The 1967–68 Allsvenskan was the 34th season of the top division of Swedish handball. 10 teams competed in the league. A playoffs at the end of the season to determine the champions was introduced this season. SoIK Hellas won the regular season, but IF Saab won the playoffs and claimed their first Swedish title. Sandvikens HK and GIK Wasaiterna were relegated.

League table

Playoffs

Semifinals
 IF Saab–Redbergslids IK 18–19, 18–17 (IF Saab advance to the finals)
 SoIK Hellas–GUIF 20–11, 26–23 (SoIK Hellas advance to the finals)

Finals
 IF Saab–SoIK Hellas 17–17, 18–17 (IF Saab champions)

References 

Swedish handball competitions